The Seattle Ice Arena was a 4,000-seat multi-purpose arena in Seattle, Washington, United States. It was home to the Seattle Metropolitans Pacific Coast Hockey Association franchise from 1915 to 1924.

Built in 1915 at the cost of $100,000, the Ice Arena was located in downtown Seattle east of what is now the Olympic Hotel on University Street. It was developed as part of the University of Washington-owned University Tract by the Metropolitan Building Company, and was designed in a style compatible to other buildings nearby. On March 26, 1917, the Metropolitans defeated the Montreal Canadiens at the arena, becoming the first American team to win the Stanley Cup. The arena was briefly a roller rink and was remodeled into a parking garage for the Olympic Hotel shortly after the 1924–25 season. It was torn down in 1963 to make way for the IBM Building.

See also

 Mercer Arena

References

Indoor ice hockey venues in the United States
Sports venues in Seattle
Defunct indoor arenas in the United States
Demolished sports venues in Washington (state)
Downtown Seattle
Indoor arenas in Washington (state)
Sports venues demolished in 1963